Al-Jura (el Jurah) was a Palestinian Arab village in the Jerusalem Subdistrict. It was depopulated during the 1948 Arab-Israeli War on July 11, 1948, under Operation Danny. It was located 8.5 km west of Jerusalem. al-Jura was mostly destroyed with the exception of several deserted houses.

History
Just west of al-Jura  there were   two Khirbats from  the Byzantine   era: Khirbat Sa'ida and Ayn al-Jadida.   Crusader presence were at  Khirbat al-Qusur, (grid.no 163/128).

Ottoman  era
Khirbat al-Qusur was  mentioned in the  Ottoman 1596  tax registers, as a place in the Al Quds  region. It had 27 Muslim households, who paid a total of 4,500 akçe in taxes.

In 1838 el-Jurah was noted   as a Muslim village, part of Beni Hasan area, located west of Jerusalem.

In 1863 Victor Guérin noted about Al-Jura: "A small village of a hundred inhabitants, fed by a rather abundant source, the water of which flows into a basin. I observed several caves cut in the rock. The valley which extends to the bottom of the village is covered with figs, olive trees and vines."

An Ottoman  village list from about 1870 found that the village had  a population of 84, in a total of  20  houses, though the population count included men, only. 

In 1883, the PEF's Survey of Western Palestine described El Jurah as "a small hamlet on the slope of the ridge, with olives below it, and a spring in the valley, about 3/4 mile to the north."

In 1896 the population of  Ed-dschora was estimated to be about 150 persons.

British Mandate  era
In the 1922 census of Palestine conducted by the British Mandate authorities, Jarah  had a population of 234 Muslims, increasing in the 1931 census to 329 Muslims, in 63  houses.

In the 1945 statistics the village had a population of 420 Muslims,  while the total land area was 4,158  dunams, according to an official land and population survey.  Of this,  2,125  were used  for plantations and irrigable land,  846 for cereals, while 27  dunams were classified as built-up areas.

1948 and aftermath
Following the war, the area was incorporated into the State of Israel. The moshav of Ora was established land that had belonged to al-Jura in 1950.

In 1992, the village site was  described: "The only structures that still stand are two limestone houses on the valley floor at the southern edge of the village. The larger house is a rectangular, two-storey building; its second storey has two arched doors, each of which is flanked by two arched windows. Almond groves cover a terrace built on the valley floor. Fig, carob, and cypress trees and cactuses grow on the site. One can see the ruins of houses, staircases, and wells on the adjacent land. The site is surrounded by cypress forests."

References

Bibliography

External links
Welcome To al-Jura
  al-Jura (Jerusalem), Zochrot
Survey of Western Palestine, Map 17:    IAA, Wikimedia commons 
Al-Jura, from the Khalil Sakakini Cultural Center

Arab villages depopulated during the 1948 Arab–Israeli War
District of Jerusalem